Amon Clarence Thomas House is a historic home located at New Harmony, Posey County, Indiana.  It was built in 1899, and is a -story, eclectic red brick dwelling with Queen Anne, Romanesque Revival, and Classical Revival style design elements.  It has fortress-like massing and sits on a brick and limestone foundation.  It features a steep hipped slate roof, projecting semi-octagonal bays, two-level porch with Ionic order columns, and arched openings.

It was listed on the National Register of Historic Places in 1995.

References

New Harmony, Indiana
Houses on the National Register of Historic Places in Indiana
Houses completed in 1899
Queen Anne architecture in Indiana
Romanesque Revival architecture in Indiana
Neoclassical architecture in Indiana
Houses in Posey County, Indiana
National Register of Historic Places in Posey County, Indiana